Jorge Luis Valderrama  (12 December 1906 – December 1964)  was a Bolivian football midfielder.

Career 
During his career he has made two appearances for the Bolivia national team at the 1930 FIFA World Cup. He has passed his career with Oruro Royal.

References

External links

Bolivian footballers
Bolivia international footballers
1930 FIFA World Cup players
Association football midfielders
1906 births
Year of death missing